The Liberal Union Party is a political party in Albania. It was established in 1998.  it was led by Teodor Laco. It won five percent of the vote in the parliamentary elections in July 2005. , this party is part of the majority coalition and the government, according to the European Commission.

See also
Liberalism in Albania

References

External links
World Fact Book entry

1998 establishments in Albania
Liberal parties in Albania
Political parties established in 1998
Political parties in Albania